Massimiliano Tagliani (born 4 April 1989 in Mazzano) is an Italian professional footballer who currently plays for Südtirol.

He represented Italy at the 2005 UEFA European Under-17 Football Championship (as well as qualifying stage), 2008 UEFA European Under-19 Football Championship and the 2009 Mediterranean Games.

Tagliani joined ACF Fiorentina from Brescia Calcio in 2005 for €1.5 million. In 2010 Tagliani joined Ravenna Calcio in co-ownership deal for a peppercorn fee of €500.

After the bankruptcy of Ravenna, Tagliani joined Südtirol in December.

References

External links
 
 FIGC 
 

1989 births
Living people
Italian footballers
Italy youth international footballers
Serie B players
A.S.D. Gallipoli Football 1909 players
F.C. Südtirol players
Ravenna F.C. players
Association football defenders
Mediterranean Games silver medalists for Italy
Mediterranean Games medalists in football
Competitors at the 2009 Mediterranean Games